Tigran Torosyan, born April 14, 1957 in Yerevan, was the President of the National Assembly of Armenia from 2006 to 2008. From 1993 he was a member of Republican Party of Armenia and the party board. In 1998-2008 he became a Deputy Chairman of the RPA board. On June 1, 2006 he was elected President of the National Assembly of Armenia. He resigned from office in 2008 after growing differences between him and other officials from the RPA, including president Serge Sargsyan which also led him to quit the party. Torosyan is married and has one daughter.

References

External links
 RFE/RL interview with Tigran Torosyan after his resignation as speaker of the National Assembly and as a member of the HHK (Sept 23, 2008)

1957 births
Living people
Politicians from Yerevan
Presidents of the National Assembly (Armenia)
National Polytechnic University of Armenia alumni
Republican Party of Armenia politicians